Cuchuflí (known as cubanitos in Argentina) is a popular sweet food in Chile and Argentina. Similar to barquillos, they are tubular-shaped desserts made from sugar, egg whites, flour, butter, and vanilla that are often filled with dulce de leche or other sweet fillings. Cuchuflíes are sold in supermarkets, neighborhood shops, and bakeries in addition to street vendors and on beaches, and they are sometimes covered in chocolate.

See also
 List of desserts

References 

Confectionery
Desserts
Chilean desserts
Chilean cuisine
Argentine cuisine